The Mission House is a historic house located in Bodden Town, Grand Cayman.  The house rose to prominence in the 1800s and became known as the "Mission House" because of early missionaries, teachers and families who lived there while establishing a Presbyterian church and school in Bodden Town.

Currently, the site is a tourist attraction with the house containing artifacts known to have been used by the Watler family.  There is also a gift shop on site.

References

Buildings and structures in the Cayman Islands
Museums in the Cayman Islands
History of the Cayman Islands
Grand Cayman